Heron Ardell "Pink" Van Gorden (October 9, 1926 – May 19, 2016) was an American politician and businessman.

Early life, education and military service
Van Gorden was born on October 9, 1926, in Alma Center, Wisconsin. He graduated from Neilsville High School in Neillsville, Wisconsin. Van Gorden was an officer in the United States Army and the Wisconsin Army National Guard.

Career
Van Gorden was involved with the family feed business. He served in the Wisconsin Assembly from 1983 to 1993 and was a Republican. He died at the Clark County Health Care  Center in Owen, Wisconsin.

References

External links

1926 births
2016 deaths
20th-century American businesspeople
People from Alma Center, Wisconsin
People from Neillsville, Wisconsin
Businesspeople from Wisconsin
Republican Party members of the Wisconsin State Assembly
National Guard (United States) officers
Military personnel from Wisconsin
United States Army officers
Wisconsin National Guard personnel